Privett is a village in the East Hampshire district, in the county of Hampshire, England.

Privett may also refer to:

 Privett, Gosport, a location in Hampshire, England
 Privett (surname), a family name (including a list of persons with the name)

See also
 Privet, a flowering plant in the genus Ligustrum
 Privet (disambiguation)